South Korean singer Hwasa has released one extended play, one single album, and three singles. In addition, the singer has one soundtrack appearance, seven collaborations and nineteen singles released as a featured artist.

Albums

Single albums

Extended plays

Singles

As lead artist

Collaborations

As featured artist

Promotional singles

Soundtrack appearances

Other songs

Other charted songs

Composition credits
All song credits are adapted from the Korea Music Copyright Association's database unless stated otherwise.

Videography

Music videos

Notes

References

Discographies of South Korean artists
K-pop discographies